Marc-Donald Fenelus (or Marco; born 22 August 1992) is a Turks & Caicos Islands footballer who currently plays for Taiwan Football Premier League club Taiwan Steel.

Career

College
Fenelus played college soccer at Western Texas College in 2011 and 2012, before transferring to Cal State Fullerton for 2013 and 2014.

Professional
On January 15, 2015, Fenelus was selected in the third round (47th overall) in the 2015 MLS SuperDraft by New England Revolution. 

Fenelus joined Taiwanese Intercity Football League side Tatung in September 2015.

In April 2020, it was revealed that Fenelus had joined Taiwan Steel.

International career
Fenelus made his debut for Turks and Caicos in a July 2011 World Cup qualification match against the Bahamas. He has represented his country in World Cup qualification games and at the 2014 Caribbean Cup.

International goals

Scores and results list Turks and Caicos Islands' goal tally first.

Coaching career
Beginning in 2016, Fenelus managed Provo Premier League club Full Physic, alongside fellow Turks and Caicos international James Rene.

References

External links

1992 births
Living people
Sportspeople from Port-au-Prince
Haitian emigrants to the Turks and Caicos Islands
Naturalised citizens of the United Kingdom
Turks and Caicos Islands footballers
Association football forwards
Cal State Fullerton Titans men's soccer players
New England Revolution draft picks
Tatung F.C. players
Turks and Caicos Islands international footballers
Turks and Caicos Islands expatriate footballers
Turks and Caicos Islands expatriate sportspeople in the United States
Expatriate soccer players in the United States
Turks and Caicos Islands expatriate sportspeople in Taiwan
Expatriate footballers in Taiwan
Turks and Caicos Islands football managers
Western Texas Westerners men's soccer players
Expatriate soccer managers in the United States
Turks and Caicos Islands people of Haitian descent
Sportspeople of Haitian descent